Radio Bulgaria (Bulgarian: Радио България, Radio Balgariya; BNR) is the official international broadcasting station of Bulgaria.

History 
For almost seventy years the world service of the Bulgarian radio, formerly called Radio Sofia but now renamed Radio Bulgaria, has been presenting the country’s cultural and national identity to the world. It is a principal source of information from and about Bulgaria for millions of listeners outside its borders.

Current broadcasting 
Radio Bulgaria ended its shortwave service on February 1, 2012, the closure of the Arabic language section in 2016, the suspension of the 24-hour online audio streaming in Bulgarian, English, Spanish, German, French, Russian, Serbian, Greek, Turkish and Albanian in 2017.

On June 10, 2021, Radio Bulgaria launched a new podcast called Bulgaria Today. it is released every day in English, German, French, Spanish, Russian, Serbian, Greek, Albanian and Turkish. The new program features news stories from Bulgaria and internationally, as well as segments about Bulgarian culture and tourism.

See also
Eastern Bloc information dissemination
List of international radio broadcasters

References

External links

Eastern Bloc mass media
International broadcasters
Radio stations in Bulgaria
Radio stations established in 1930
State media